Aleksander Leonidovich Lesun (born 1 July 1988) is a Belarusian-born naturalized Russian modern pentathlete. He is a multiple-time medalist at the World and European Championships, and was a top-ranked male modern pentathlete in the world by the Union Internationale de Pentathlon Moderne (UIPM).

Career
Lesun started out his sporting career as a swimmer, before switching to modern pentathlon at the very young age. He first competed at the European and World Junior Championships in 2008, and had achieved five top-ten finishes. In late 2009, Lesun moved to Russia from Belarus, and obtained a dual citizenship and a Russian passport.

Lesun returned to the international scene in early 2010, and was formally admitted to the national team.  He competed at the World Championships in Chengdu, China, where he won two medals, one for the individual and one for the team relay. He also added his first ever gold medal at the 2010 World Cup in Budapest, Hungary.

In 2012, Lesun emerged as Russia's best medal prospect, and a top favorite to win gold at his first Olympics. He had broken his streak of silver medal finishes in his 2011 breakthrough season and also beat the former world and defending Olympic champion Moiseev to win his first individual gold medal at the 2012 World Modern Pentathlon Championships in Rome, Italy.

Following his triumph, Lesun qualified for the 2012 Summer Olympics in London, along with Moiseev, to compete in the men's event, which included a first-ever combined running and shooting segment. During the competition, Lesun made a strong showing in the fencing segment, tying in second place with China's Cao Zhongrong for a score of twenty-five victories, but struggled to maintain his position in the entire event, with disappointing scores in freestyle swimming and horse riding. At the combined running and shooting discipline, Lesun progressed into the event in third place, until he was surpassed by Hungary's Ádám Marosi to win the bronze medal, dropping him out of the podium to a fourth-place finish, with a score of 5,764 points.

In 2016, he won the gold medal at the Rio Olympics with a total of 1479 points, which was an Olympic record at the time.

At the 2017 World Modern Pentathlon Championships in Cairo, Egypt, Lesun suffered a back injury in the fencing segment, leaving him without a medal in the individual competition. However, he won bronze with his team.

He resigned from the Russian team following the invasion of Ukraine in February 2022, opting to return to Belarus.

Awards
 Order of Friendship (2016)

References

External links
 
 

Belarusian male modern pentathletes
Russian male modern pentathletes
1988 births
Living people
Olympic modern pentathletes of Russia
Modern pentathletes at the 2012 Summer Olympics
Sportspeople from Minsk
World Modern Pentathlon Championships medalists
Belarusian emigrants to Russia
Russian people of Belarusian descent
Naturalised citizens of Russia
Modern pentathletes at the 2016 Summer Olympics
Medalists at the 2016 Summer Olympics
Olympic gold medalists for Russia
Olympic medalists in modern pentathlon
Russian activists against the 2022 Russian invasion of Ukraine